The architecture of Western Australia has been influenced by the legacy of being an English colony in the late nineteenth century.

Colonial architecture remains scattered through the capital city Perth, and regional centres.

Despite the separation from the rest of Australia by distance, the influence of Australian styles was marked upon building and designing in Western Australia.

Notable architects include those who were Principal architect:
 1891 – 1897 George Temple-Poole
 1897 – 1905 John Harry Grainger
 1905 – 1917 Hillson Beasley
 1917 – 1927 William Hardwick

References 

Architecture in Western Australia
Architects from Western Australia